Sambo competition has been in the Universiade  as optional sport. Sambo will be an optional sport again at the 2023 Summer World University Games, to be held in Yekaterinburg, Russian Federation.

Medal summary

Medal table

References

External links
2013 Summer Universiade – Sambo

 
Sports at the Summer Universiade
Universiade